The Nine Sisters or the Morros are a chain of twenty-three, although typically only nine are included, volcanic mountains and hills in western San Luis Obispo County, Southern California. They run between Morro Bay and San Luis Obispo.

Geography
The peaks were created more than 20 million years ago during the Miocene Epoch of the Neogene Period, as volcanic plugs of magma which welled up and solidified inside softer rock which has since eroded away. Every plug, with the exception of just two, formed in a nearly straight line.

Two of the plugs are in Morro Bay State Park.

Peaks
The peaks in order from Morro Bay to San Luis Obispo, including their height, a sortable table.

Features
The Nine Sisters, being less accessible to human intrusions, support a wide variety of Coastal sage scrub and California oak woodlands flora, and of birds and other fauna.

Their volcanic origin makes them of significant geological interest. They are popular with photographers and rock climbers.

Panorama

References

External links

 
Landforms of San Luis Obispo County, California
Volcanic plugs of California
Morro Bay
San Luis Obispo, California